The Singapore National Day Parade 2017, also known as NDP 2017, is a national parade and ceremony that held on 9 August 2017 in commemoration of Singapore's 52nd year of independence. It located at The Float at Marina Bay, also the 10th anniversary of the venue which was first built for the NDP Celebrations in 2007. As the life span for the floating venue is 10 years, this could possibly be the final edition of the NDP that held at the Float. likewise it was also the commemoration of NS50 which marks 50 years of National Service in Singapore since 1967 and also was the last National Day Parade for former President Tony Tan Keng Yam who was ending his 6-year term as the 7th President of Singapore.

References

2017 in Singapore
Military parades in Singapore